Schwarzwassertal is German for "black water valley" and may refer to the following valleys in Central Europe:

 the valley of the Black Pockau in the Ore Mountains
 the Schwarzwassertal in Tyrol, a side valley of the Lech valley
 the Schwarzwassertal in Vorarlberg, a side valley of the Kleinwalsertal
and the valley of various rivers called the Schwarzwasser.